Oliyum Oliyum (English: Sound and Light) is a Tamil movie song compilation program on television popular during the 1980s.  It aired at 7:30pm on Fridays on Doordarshan, a Tamil regional network and features songs from Tamil movies.  This was most popular entertainment program in Tamil Nadu after Tamil movies which aired on Sunday evenings. recently there is a website name  "oleyumoliyum" which deals kind of same idea.

References

See also
 Chitralahari

Tamil-language television